is a Japanese composer of contemporary classical music.

Early life and education
Joji Yuasa was born in Kōriyama, Fukushima and is a self-taught composer. He first became interested in music while a pre medical student at Keio University, and in 1952 he joined a young artists’ group Jikken Kobo (Experimental Workshop, 1951 - 1957) in Tokyo, an organization for the exploration of new directions in the arts, including multimedia.

Career 
From 1981 to 1994 he was a music researcher and professor at the University of California, San Diego, where he is currently a professor emeritus. He has also served as a guest professor at the Tokyo College of Music since 1981, a professor at Nihon University since 1993 and an honorary member of ISCM.  Yuasa is the recipient of a 1996 Suntory Music Award.

Yuasa has written a wide range of compositions, including orchestral, choral and chamber music, music for theatre, and intermedia, electronic and computer music. His style has been described as "consistent explorations of a distinctive, maverick yet elegant voice" that has elements of twelve tone, impressionism, romantic, and traditional classical composition.

As a guest composer and lecturer, he has contributed to the Festival of the Arts of This Century in Hawaii (1970), New Music Concerts in Toronto (1980), Asian Composers League in Hong Kong (1981), concert tour for Contemporary Music Network by British Arts Council (1981), Asia Pacific Festival in New Zealand (1984), Composers Workshop in Amsterdam (1984), Darmstadt Summer Course for Contemporary Music (1988), Lerchenborg Music Tage (1986, 1988), the Pacific Music Festival in Sapporo (1990), and Music of Japan Today: Tradition and Innovation (Hamilton College, NY - 1992).

Selected commissions 
His works have been commissioned by the Koussevitzky Music Foundation, Saarland Radio Symphony Orchestra, Helsinki Philharmonic Orchestra, Japan Philharmonic Orchestra, NHK Symphony Orchestra, Canada Council, Suntory Music Foundation, IRCAM and National Endowment for the Arts of the U.S.A.

Selected fellowships and awards 
He has received a number of fellowships and awards, from: Japan Society Fellowship (1968–69), Composer in Residence at the Center for Music Experiment UCSD (1976), Berlin Artist Program by DAAD (1976–77), the New South Wales Conservatorium of Music in Sydney (1980), the University of Toronto (1981) and IRCAM (1987).

References

External links
Jikken Kobo
Joji Yuasa List of Works
Joji Yuasa site
Schott Music
Discogs

 

1929 births
20th-century classical composers
20th-century Japanese composers
21st-century classical composers
21st-century Japanese composers
Japanese classical composers
Japanese male classical composers
Living people
Musicians from Fukushima Prefecture
Academic staff of Nihon University
People from Kōriyama
People from San Diego County, California
20th-century Japanese male musicians
21st-century Japanese male musicians